Salpinga is a genus of flowering plants belonging to the family Melastomataceae.

Its native range is Southern Tropical America.

Species:

Salpinga ciliata 
Salpinga dimorpha 
Salpinga glandulosa 
Salpinga longifolia 
Salpinga maguirei 
Salpinga maranonensis 
Salpinga margaritacea 
Salpinga monostachya 
Salpinga paleacea 
Salpinga peruviana 
Salpinga pusilla 
Salpinga secunda

References

Melastomataceae
Melastomataceae genera